Sonja Tol (born 16 November 1972 in Ede) is a Dutch épée fencer.

Tol represented the Netherlands at the 2004 Summer Olympics where she reached the second round in which she was eliminated by Ildikó Mincza-Nébald of Hungary 15-7.

References

External links
Tol at the Dutch Olympic Archive

1972 births
Living people
Dutch female épée fencers
Olympic fencers of the Netherlands
Fencers at the 2004 Summer Olympics
People from Ede, Netherlands
Sportspeople from Gelderland
Royal Netherlands Navy officers
21st-century Dutch women